Men of Rock is a 2010 TV series produced by the BBC about pioneering geologists working in Scotland. It is presented by Professor Iain Stewart.

Episodes
Deep Time 1/3 The story of James Hutton, the founding father of geology.

Moving Mountains 2/3 An examination of how geologist Edward Bailey discovered Scotland once had super volcanoes.

The Big Freeze 3/3 The story of Louis Agassiz, who first proposed that the earth had experienced an ice age.

References

External links
 

2010 British television series debuts
2010 British television series endings
BBC television documentaries about science
Science education television series
2010s British documentary television series
English-language television shows
Geology of Scotland